Robert Cecil Olby (born in Beckenham on October 4, 1933; died December 31, 2020) was a research professor in the Department of History and Philosophy of Science at the University of Pittsburgh. Formerly Reader at the University of Leeds, UK, Robert Olby is a historian of 19th and 20th century biology, his specialist fields being genetics and molecular biology. With the assistance of Martin Packer, Olby completed an authorized biography of the late Francis Crick. It is entitled Francis Crick: Hunter of Life's Secrets, after an article in The New York Times on February 2, 1962.

Books and papers by Robert Olby
 Charles Darwin; Oxford University Press, London, 1967, 64pp.
 Early Nineteenth Century European Scientists; Pergamon Press, 1967, 179pp.  
The Origins of Mendelism; Constable 1966. 204 pages 
 The Twentieth Century Sciences, Studies in the Biography of Ideas, edited by Gerald Holton; W.W. Norton & Co., New York 1972: article "Francis Crick, DNA, and the Central Dogma".
 'Rosalind Elsie Franklin' biography in Dictionary of Scientific Biography, ed. Charles C. Gillespie (New York: Charles Scribner's Sons) 
The Path to the Double Helix: The Discovery of DNA; University of Washington Press, Seattle 1974 & revised 1994) 
 Companion to the History of Modern Science (ed.); Routledge, London, 1990, 1081pp. 
 "Robert Darlington: Forgotten Prophet of Genetics", American Scientist Nov-Dec 2004
 "Quiet debut for the double helix" Nature 421 (January 23, 2003): 402–405.
Oxford Dictionary of National Biography:‘Huxley, Sir Julian Sorell (1887–1975)’, first published Sept 2004, 2680 words 
Oxford Dictionary of National Biography: ‘Bernal, (John) Desmond (1901–1971)’, first published Sept 2004, 2870 words, with portrait illustration
 "Francis Crick: Hunter of Life's Secrets", Cold Spring Harbor Laboratory Press, published 25 August 2009; 450 pp;  and Peter Lawrence's review in "Current Biology" .
'Crick, Francis Harry Compton (1916–2004)', Oxford Dictionary of National Biography, online edn, Oxford University Press, Jan. 2008
'Perutz, Max Ferdinand (1914-2002)', Oxford Dictionary of National Biography, online edn, Oxford University Press, Jan. 2008
'Wilkins, Maurice Hugh Frederick (1916-2004)', Oxford Dictionary of National Biography, online edn, Oxford University Press, Jan. 2008

See also
History of biology
Charles Darwin
Gregor Mendel

External links
 
 His Australian lecture, March 2010
 Late Night Live Interview
 Quotes on Linus Pauling and The Race for DNA from the Oregon State University web site.
 For Martin Packer's web site: Remembering Francis Crick.

Historians of science
Academics of the University of Leeds
1933 births
Living people